The mountain robin-chat (Cossypha isabellae) is a species of bird in the family Muscicapidae.

It is found in the Cameroonian Highlands forests. Its natural habitat is subtropical or tropical moist montane forests.

References

mountain robin-chat
Birds of Central Africa
mountain robin-chat
mountain robin-chat
Taxonomy articles created by Polbot
Taxobox binomials not recognized by IUCN